Facundo Britos (born 5 June 1996) is an Argentine professional footballer who plays as a midfielder.

Career
Britos played youth football for Club Barrio Norte, Tiro Federal and Unión Santa Fe. His senior footballing career began in 2016 with Unión Santa Fe of the Argentine Primera División. He was an unused sub on 8 November versus Atlético Tucumán, prior to making his professional debut a month later during a 2–0 victory over Rosario Central. It was his sole appearance in the 2016–17 Argentine Primera División, though he did feature in a Copa Argentina tie with Nueva Chicago in June 2017.

Career statistics
.

References

External links

1996 births
Living people
People from Gualeguay Department
Argentine footballers
Association football midfielders
Argentine Primera División players
Sportspeople from Entre Ríos Province
Unión de Santa Fe footballers
Atlético de Rafaela footballers
Deportivo Armenio footballers
Talleres de Remedios de Escalada footballers